Golland is a surname. Notable people with this surname include:

David Hamilton Golland (born 1971), American historian
John Golland (1942–1993), English composer
Jonas Golland, British musician, drummer for The Tiger Lillies
Joseph Golland, actor in The Trap (1966 film)
Norman Golland, American criminal, accomplice in murder of entertainer J. Walter Leopold
Polina Golland (born 1971), Israeli-American computer scientist
Stuart Golland (1945–2003), English actor
Yvonne Golland, English cricketer